Prosperous and Qualified is the second studio album by free jazz ensemble Universal Congress Of, released in 1988 through SST.

Track listing

Personnel 
Adapted from the Prosperous and Qualified liner notes.

Universal Congress Of
Joe Baiza – guitar, vocals
Jacob Cohn – alto saxophone
Ralph Gorodetsky – bass guitar
Jason Kahn – drums
Lynn Johnston – tenor saxophone, clarinet, bass guitar, baritone saxophone
Steve Moss – tenor saxophone, vocals

Production and additional personnel
Martin Lyon – photography
Vitus Mataré – production, engineering
Universal Congress Of – production

Release history

References

External links 
 

1988 albums
SST Records albums
Universal Congress Of albums